William James Niall Rudd (23 June 1927 – 5 October 2015) was an Irish-born British classical scholar.

Life and work

Rudd was born in Dublin and studied Classics at Trinity College, Dublin. He then taught Latin at the Universities of Hull and Manchester. From 1958 to 1968 he was Associate Professor of Latin at University College, Toronto. In 1968 he returned to England and taught for five years as a professor of Latin at the University of Liverpool. In 1973 he moved to the University of Bristol to the chair of Latin, where he remained until his retirement in 1989. From 1976 to 1979 he was Director (Head of Department) of the Department of Classics and Archaeology.

After retirement Rudd returned to Liverpool and was appointed an Honorary Research Fellow there. Trinity College Dublin awarded him an honorary doctorate in 1998 (DLitt). Rudd died of Melanoma after a long illness (Alzheimer's) on 5 October 2015 at St. John's Hospice on the Wirral.

Rudd worked intensively with Latin literature, especially Roman poetry, and its reception in English literature of the modern age. He wrote books, monographs and articles about works of Cicero, and on the satires of Horace and Juvenal whose work he presented in English translation. This work has been published in two collections (1994, 2005). In addition, he published, in 1994, an autobiographical record of his childhood and youth in Ireland.

Bibliography 
 The Satires of Horace. A Study (1966) Cambridge: Cambridge University Press 
 The Satires of Horace and Persius. A verse translation with an introduction and notes (1973) London: Harmondsworth Press
 Essays on Classical Literature, Selected from Arion and introduced by Niall Rudd (1974) Cambridge: Heffer Press
 Lines of Enquiry – Studies in Latin Poetry (1976) Cambridge: Cambridge University Press
 with Edward Courtney: Juvenal: Satires I, III, X (1977) Bristol: Bristol Classical Press
 T. E. Page: Schoolmaster Extraordinary (1981) Bristol: Bristol Classical Press
 The Satires of Horace (1982) Bristol: Bristol Classical Press
 Themes in Roman Satire (1986) London: Duckworth Press
 Cicero: 'De Legibus I'''. (1987) Bristol: Bristol Classical Press
 Horace, Epistles Book II and Epistle to the Pisones (‘Ars Poetica’) (1989) Cambridge: Cambridge University Press
 Juvenal. The Satires (1991) Oxford: Oxford University Press
 The Classical Tradition in Operation: Chaucer/Virgil, Shakespeare/Plautus, Pope/Horace, Tennyson/Lucretius, Pound/Propertius (1994) Toronto: University of Toronto Press
 Pale Green, Light Orange. A Portrait of Bourgeois Ireland 1930-1950 (1994) Dublin: Lilliput Press
 with JGF Powell: Marcus Tullius Cicero: 'The Republic' and 'The Laws' (1998) Oxford: Oxford University Press
 with Robin G. M. Nisbet: A Commentary on Horace, Odes, Book III (2004) Oxford: Oxford University Press
 Horace, Odes and Epodes (2004) Cambridge (Massachusetts): Harvard University Press (Loeb Classical Library)
 The Common Spring. Essays on Latin and English Poetry. (2005) Exeter: Bristol Phoenix Press
 Lines of Enquiry. Studies in Latin Poetry (2005) Cambridge: Cambridge University Press
 Samuel Johnson: The Latin Poems (2005) Lewisburg: Bucknell University Press
 Landor’s Latin Poems: Fifty Pieces'' (2010) Lewisburg: Bucknell University Press

References

British classical scholars
Irish classical scholars
1927 births
2015 deaths